Fred Wise (October 3, 1881 – July 26, 1950) was an American dermatologist. He is a co-eponym of Wise-Rein disease along with Charles R. Rein.

References

External links
 Who Named It? entry on Fred Wise

1881 births
1950 deaths
American dermatologists